Ramales de La Victoria is a municipality located in the autonomous community of Cantabria, Spain. The Battle of Ramales took place here in 1839 during the First Carlist War.

See also
Gibaja

References

Municipalities in Cantabria